Isla de Maipo is a town and commune of the Talagante Province in central Chile's Santiago Metropolitan Region.

Geography
In general, the commune is characterized as predominantly rural, which is reflected in its landscape of colonial houses, cultivated farms, vineyards, natural sites and the predominance of agricultural activities, which is carried out by the majority of its population. The Maipo River is the most important in the whole metropolitan area, because it supports the highest population density in Chile and is also the main stream which irrigates the area.

Economy
Isla de Maipo is an agricultural community, primarily devoted to growing vines and other fruits typical of Mediterranean climate, such as lemons, avocados and apples. ¨The most important wineries in the town are De Martino (Santa Inés), Canepa, Viña Tarapacá, Santa Ema and Terramater. Also, there are other small companies that produce wine for bigger wineries. 
However, one of the most important problems in Isla de Maipo is still the unemployment and the small number of qualified jobs.

Traditions
One of its traditions is the Fiesta de La Virgen de La Merced. This feast is celebrated the last Sunday of September each year and attracts more than 80,000 pilgrims from all parts of the region, across the country and abroad. Also, La Fiesta de la Vendimia (Grape harvest feast) is celebrated every year, calling together local inhabitants and foreign tourists. The festival allows tourists to familiarize themselves with the culinary art of the commune, especially the high quality of its wines. The Plaza de Armas is converted into a large dining room, where one can hear folk and other varieties of music.

Demographics
According to the 2002 census of the National Statistics Institute, Isla de Maipo had 25,798 inhabitants (13,095 men and 12,703 women). Of these, 18,865 (73.1%) lived in urban areas and 6,933 (26.9%) in rural areas. The population grew by 26.8% (5,454 persons) between the 1992 and 2002 censuses.

Administration
As a commune, Isla de Maipo is a third-level administrative division of Chile administered by municipal council, headed by an alcalde who is directly elected every four years. For the years 2012-2016, the alcalde is Carlos Adasme Godoy (PDC), and his council members are:
 Pedro Montalva Montalva (PS)
 Maximiliano Genskowski Inostroza (UDI)
 Emilio Astudillo Rojas (PPD)
 José Riquelme Herrera (PDC)
 Katherinne Flores Trincado (RN)
 Valeria Manríquez Urrea (PS)

Within the electoral divisions of Chile, Isla de Maipo is represented in the Chamber of Deputies by Denise Pascal (PS) and Gonzalo Uriarte (UDI) as part of the 31st electoral district, (together with Talagante, Peñaflor, El Monte, Melipilla, María Pinto, Curacaví, Alhué, San Pedro and Padre Hurtado). The commune is represented in the Senate by Guido Girardi Lavín (PPD) and Jovino Novoa Vásquez (UDI) as part of the 7th senatorial constituency (Santiago-West).

References

External links
 Official link - Municipality of Isla de Maipo

Communes of Chile
Populated places in Talagante Province